The Coddington School is a historic school building at 26-44 Coddington Street in Quincy, Massachusetts.  Built in 1909, this three-story brick building is the finest Colonial Revival school building in the city.  It was designed in late 1907 by Charles A. Brigham, who is not to be confused with the better known and similarly-named Charles Brigham.  It was used from the 1960s to the 2000s as part of Quincy Junior College (now Quincy College), and is now the headquarters of the Quincy School Department, as well as other municipal departments.

The building was listed on the National Register of Historic Places in 1989.

See also
National Register of Historic Places listings in Quincy, Massachusetts

References

School buildings on the National Register of Historic Places in Massachusetts
Colonial Revival architecture in Massachusetts
School buildings completed in 1909
Schools in Norfolk County, Massachusetts
Defunct schools in Massachusetts
National Register of Historic Places in Quincy, Massachusetts
Buildings and structures in Quincy, Massachusetts
1909 establishments in Massachusetts